Robert Booker may refer to:
 Robert D. Booker (1920–1943), United States Army soldier and Medal of Honor recipient
 Robert Booker (politician) (born 1962), American historian, author, and politician 
 Bob Booker (born 1958), English footballer